Mehran is derived from the term mehr (English: sun), relating to Mithra, an ancient Zoroastrian Persian deity.

Mehran may refer to:

Places

Iran
 Mehran (district), a neighborhood of northern Tehran, capital of Iran
 Mehran, Alborz, a village in Alborz Province
 Mehran, Ilam, a city in Ilam Province
 Mehran County, Ilam Province
 Mehran Rural District, Hormozgan Province

Pakistan
 Mehran, a name for Sindh province in Pakistan
 Gulshan-e-Mehran, a suburb of Karachi, Pakistan
 Mehran Town, Korangi Industrial Area, Karachi, Sindh
 PNS Mehran, a naval base in Pakistan

Rivers
Mehran River, in Hormozgan Province, Iran
 Mehran River, another name for the Komur River, a tributary of the Aji Chai in Iran
 Mehran River, a local name for the Indus River in Sindh, Pakistan

Other
 Mehran (name)
 Mehran, is a character in the Persian epic poem Shahnameh
 Mehran (magazine), Pakistan
 Mehran Force, a defunct Pakistan paramilitary organization
 Mehran Highway, in Sindh, Pakistan
 Mehran University of Engineering & Technology, in Jamshoro, Sindh, Pakistan
 Battle of Mehran, an 1986 battle in the Iran-Iraq War
 Daily Mehran, a daily newspaper in Sindh, Pakistan
 House of Mehran, an Iranian noble family
 Suzuki Mehran, an economic car manufactured and marketed by Suzuki in Pakistan